ABP Ananda (formerly Star Ananda) is a free to air Bengali news channel based in Kolkata, West Bengal owned by ABP Group. Founded on 1 June 2005 as Star Ananda, a joint venture between Star India and the ABP Group, the channel was renamed as ABP Ananda on 1 June 2012 after the ABP Group acquired full control of the organization.

References

External links
  
 ABP Ananda on YouTube   
    
 

 

ABP Group
24-hour television news channels in India
Television stations in Kolkata
Former News Corporation subsidiaries
Bengali-language television channels in India
Television channels and stations established in 2005
2005 establishments in West Bengal